AstraZeneca plc is a British-Swedish multinational pharmaceutical and biotechnology company with its headquarters at the Cambridge Biomedical Campus in Cambridge, England. It has a portfolio of products for major diseases in areas including oncology, cardiovascular, gastrointestinal, infection,  neuroscience, respiratory, and inflammation. It has been involved in developing the Oxford–AstraZeneca COVID-19 vaccine.

The company was founded in 1999 through the merger of the Swedish Astra AB and the British Zeneca Group (itself formed by the demerger of the pharmaceutical operations of Imperial Chemical Industries in 1993). Since the merger it has been among the world's largest pharmaceutical companies and has made numerous corporate acquisitions, including Cambridge Antibody Technology (in 2006), MedImmune (in 2007), Spirogen (in 2013) and Definiens (by MedImmune in 2014). It has its research and development concentrated in three strategic centres: Cambridge, England; Gothenburg, Sweden and Gaithersburg in Maryland, U.S.

AstraZeneca has a primary listing on the London Stock Exchange and is a constituent of the FTSE 100 Index.

History
Astra AB was founded in 1913 in Södertälje, Sweden, by 400 doctors and apothecaries. In 1993 the British chemicals company ICI (established from four British chemical companies) demerged its pharmaceuticals businesses and its agrochemicals and specialities businesses, to form Zeneca Group PLC. Finally, in 1999 Astra and Zeneca Group merged to form AstraZeneca plc, with its headquarters in London. In 1999, AstraZeneca identified a new location for the company's US base, the "Fairfax-plus" site in North Wilmington, Delaware.

2000–06
In 2002, its drug Iressa (gefitinib) was approved in Japan as monotherapy for non-small cell lung cancer. On 3 January 2004 Dr Robert Nolan, a former director of AstraZeneca, formed the management team of ZI Medical.

In 2005, the company acquired KuDOS Pharmaceuticals, a UK biotech company, for £120 million. and entered into an anti-cancer collaboration agreement with Astex It also announced that it had become a Diamond Member of the Pennsylvania Bio commerce organisation.

In 2006, following a collaborative relationship begun in 2004, AstraZeneca acquired Cambridge Antibody Technology for £702 million.

2007–12: The patent cliff and subsequent acquisitions

In February 2007, AstraZeneca agreed to buy Arrow Therapeutics, a company focused on the discovery and development of anti-viral therapies, for US$150million. AstraZeneca's pipeline, and "patent cliff", was the subject of much speculation in April 2007 leading to pipeline-boosting collaboration and acquisition activities. A few days later AstraZeneca acquired US company MedImmune for about US$15.2 billion to gain flu vaccines and an anti-viral treatment for infants; AstraZeneca subsequently consolidated all of its biologics operations into a dedicated biologics division called MedImmune.

In 2010, AstraZeneca acquired Novexel Corp, an antibiotics discovery company formed in 2004 as a spin-off of the Sanofi-Aventis anti-infectives division. Astra acquired the experimental antibiotic NXL-104 (CEF104) (CAZ-AVI) through this acquisition.

In 2011, AstraZeneca acquired Guangdong BeiKang Pharmaceutical Company, a Chinese generics business.

In February 2012, AstraZeneca and Amgen announced a collaboration on treatments for inflammatory diseases. Then in April 2012, AstraZeneca acquired Ardea Biosciences, another biotechnology company, for $1.26 billion. In June 2012, AstraZeneca and Bristol Myers Squibb announced a two-stage deal for the joint acquisition of the biotechnology company Amylin Pharmaceuticals. It was agreed that Bristol Myers Squibb would acquire Amylin for $5.3 billion in cash and the assumption of $1.7 billion in debt, with AstraZeneca then paying $3.4 billion in cash to Bristol Myers Squibb, and Amylin being folded into an existing diabetes joint venture between AstraZeneca and Bristol Myers Squibb.

2013 restructuring and beyond

2013
In March 2013 AstraZeneca announced plans for a major corporate restructuring, including the closure of its research and development activities at Alderley Park in Cheshire and Loughborough in the UK and at Lund in Sweden, investment of $500million in the construction of a new research and development facility in Cambridge and the concentration of R&D in three locations: Cambridge, Gaithersburg, Maryland (location of MedImmune, where it will work on biotech drugs), and Gothenburg in Sweden, for research on traditional chemical drugs. AstraZeneca also announced that it would move its corporate headquarters from London to Cambridge in 2016. That announcement included the announcement that it would cut 1,600 jobs; three days later it announced it would cut an additional 2,300 jobs. It also announced that it would focus on three therapeutic areas: Respiratory Inflammation & Autoimmunity, Cardiovascular & Metabolic Disease, and Oncology. In October 2013, AstraZeneca announced it would acquire biotech oncology company Spirogen for around US$440 million.

2014
On 19 May 2014 AstraZeneca rejected a "final offer" from Pfizer of £55 per share, which valued the company at £69.4billion (US$117billion). The companies had been meeting since January 2014. If the takeover had proceeded, Pfizer would have become the world's biggest drug maker. The transaction would also have been the biggest foreign takeover of a British company. Many in Britain, including politicians and scientists, had opposed the deal. In July 2014 the company entered into a deal with Almirall to acquire its subsidiary Almirall Sofotec and its lung treatments including the COPD drug, Eklira. The US$2.1 billion deal included an allocation of US$1.2 billion for development in the respiratory franchise, one of AstraZeneca's three target therapeutic areas announced the year before. In August 2014 the company announced it had entered into a three-year collaboration with Mitsubishi Tanabe Pharma on diabetic nephropathy. In September 2014 the company would join forces with Eli Lilly in developing and commercialising its candidate BACE inhibitor – AZD3292 – used for the treatment of Alzheimer's disease. The deal could yield up to US$500 million for the company. In November 2014 the company's biologics R&D operation, MedImmune, agreed to acquire Definiens for more than US$150 million. The company also began a Phase I/II trial collaboration with Pharmacyclics and Janssen Biotech investigating combination treatments. Also in November of the same year, the company agreed to sell its lipodystrophy treatment business to Aegerion Pharmaceuticals for more than US$325 million. In December, the company received accelerated FDA approval for Olaparib in the treatment of women with advanced ovarian cancer who have a BRCA genetic mutation. A major criterion governing the drugs approval was, on average, its ability to shrink tumours in patients for 7.9 months.

2015
In February 2015, the company announced it would acquire the US and Canadian rights to Actavis's branded respiratory drug business for an initial sum of US$600 million. Later in the same month the company announced it would partner with Orca Pharmaceuticals to develop retinoic acid-related orphan nuclear receptor gamma inhibitors for use in the treatment of a number of autoimmune diseases, which could generate up to US$122.5 million for Orca. The company also announced its plan to spend US$40 million creating a new subsidiary focused on small molecule anti-infectives – primarily in the research of the gyrase inhibitor, AZD0914, which is currently in Phase II for the treatment of gonorrhea. The company underwrote twenty out of thirty-two seats of a new Cambridge– Gothenburg service by Sun-Air of Scandinavia.

In mid-March the company announced it would co-commercialise naloxegol along with Daiichi Sankyo in a deal worth up to US$825 million. Towards the end of April the company announced a number of collaborations worth an estimated US$1.8 billion; first, to develop and commercialise MEDI4736, with Celgene, for use against non-Hodgkin’s lymphoma, myelodysplastic syndromes, and multiple myeloma with AstraZeneca receiving US$450 million. The second of two deals is an agreement to study a combination treatment of MEDI4736 and Innate Pharma's Phase II anti-NKG2A antibody IPH2201 for up to US$1.275 billion. The company's MedImmune arm also launched collaborative clinical trials with Juno Therapeutics, investigating combination treatments for cancer. The trials will assess combinations of MEDI4736 and one of Juno Therapeutics' CD19 directed chimeric antigen receptor T-cell candidates. In late June the company announced it has entered into a partnership agreement with Eolas Therapeutics on the Eolas Orexin-1 Receptor Antagonist (EORA) program for smoking cessation and other treatments. In July the company announced it would sell off its rights to Entocort (budesonide) to Tillotts Pharma for US$215 million. In July 2015, Genzyme announced it would acquire the rare cancer drug Caprelsa (vandetanib) from AstraZeneca for up to US$300 million. In August, the company announced it had acquired the global rights to develop and commercialise Heptares Therapeutics' drug candidate HTL-1071, which focuses on blocking the adenosine A2A receptor, in a deal worth up to US$510 million. In the same month the company's MedImmune subsidiary acquired exclusive rights to Inovio Pharmaceuticals' INO-3112 immunotherapy, currently in Phase I/II, under an agreement which could net more than US$727.5 million for Inovio. INO-3112 targets Human papillomavirus types 16 and 18. In September, Valeant licensed Brodalumab from the company for up to US$445 million. On 6 November it was reported that AstraZeneca had acquired ZS Pharma for US$2.7 billion. In December the company announced its intention to acquire the respiratory portfolio of Takeda Pharmaceutical – namely Alvesco and Omnaris – for US$575 million A day later, the company announced it had taken a 55% majority stake in Acerta for US$4 billion. As part of the transaction the company will gain commercial rights to Acerta's irreversible oral Bruton's tyrosine kinase inhibitor, acalabrutinib (ACP-196), which is currently in Phase III development for B-cell blood cancers and in Phase I or II clinical trials in solid tumours. In 2015, it was the eighth-largest drug company in the world based on sales revenue.

2017
In July 2017, the company's CEO Pascal Soriot said that Brexit would not affect its commitment to its current plans in the United Kingdom. However, it had slowed decision making for new investment projects waiting for a post-Brexit regulatory regime to settle down.

In September 2017, the company's chairman Leif Johansson planned in taking the "first steps" in moving its research and manufacturing operations away from the United Kingdom, if there is a hard Brexit.

In 2017, it was the eleventh largest drug company in the world based on sales and ranked seventh based on R&D investment.

In January EVP Pam Cheng stated that AstraZeneca has ignited startup of duplicate QA testing facility in Sweden and has initiated hiring in Sweden.

2018
In February 2018, AstraZeneca announced it was spinning off six early-stage experimental drugs into a new biotechnology company, known as Viela Bio, valued at US$250 million.

On 6 December 2018, AstraZeneca purchased nearly 8% of the American pharmaceutical business, Moderna.

2019
In March 2019, AstraZeneca announced it will pay up to US$6.9 billion to work with Daiichi Sankyo Co Ltd on an experimental treatment for breast cancer. AstraZeneca plans to use some of the proceeds of a US$3.5 billion share issue to fund the deal. The deal on the drug known as trastuzumab deruxtecan sent shares in Japan's Daiichi soaring 16%.

In September 2019, the company announced that it would cease drug production at its German headquarters in Wedel, leading to the loss of 175 jobs by the end of 2021.

In October 2019, AstraZeneca announced it would sell the global commercial rights for its drug to treat acid reflux to German pharmaceutical company Cheplapharm Arzneimittel GmbH for as much as US$276 million.

2020
In February 2020, AstraZeneca agreed to sublicense its global rights (except Europe, Canada and Israel) to the drug Movantik, to Redhill Biopharma.

In June 2020, AstraZeneca made a preliminary approach to Gilead Sciences about a potential merger, worth almost US$240 billion. However, these plans were subsequently dropped because it would have distracted the company from its own pipeline and ongoing COVID-19 vaccine efforts.

In July 2020, the business entered into its second collaboration with Daiichi Sankyo, centred around the development of DS-1062, an antibody drug conjugate. The deal could potentially be worth up to US$6 billion for Daiichi.

In September 2020, AstraZeneca acquired the preclinical oral PCSK9 inhibitor program from Dogma Therapeutics.

On 27 December 2020, AstraZeneca CEO Pascal Soriot said that they have “figured out the winning formula” with their two-dose system with the Oxford University’s COVID-19 vaccine.

On 30 December 2020, the United Kingdom approved the emergency use of the Oxford–AstraZeneca COVID-19 vaccine.

2021
In July 2021, AstraZeneca acquired Alexion Pharmaceuticals. In October 2021, the company, through Alexion, acquired Caelum Biosciences and its monoclonal treatment (CAEL-101) for light chain (AL) amyloidosis for up to $500 million.

2022
In July, the company announced it would acquire TeneoTwo for up to $1.3 billion, increasing its blood cancer drug offering. In October 2022 it was announced that the company would acquire LogicBio Therapeutics, which was active in clinical-stage genomic medicine.

In November 2022, it was announced AstraZeneca had acquired the Amsterdam-headquartered clinical-stage biotechnology company, Neogene Therapeutics.

2023
In January, AstraZeneca announced it would acquire CinCor Pharma for $1.8 billion.

Vaxzevria, AstraZeneca's COVID-19 pandemic response

The road to authorisation by the European Medicines Agency 
In March 2020, the company announced that it would be donating PPE, including 9 million face masks, to help support various international health organisations mitigating the COVID-19 pandemic.

In April 2020, Chief Executive Pascal Soriot, reported that the company was working with GlaxoSmithKline and the University of Cambridge to develop a new laboratory capable of conducting 30,000 COVID-19 tests per day. The company also announced plans for a clinical trial to assess the potential use of Calquence in the treatment of COVID-19.

In June 2020, the National Institute of Allergy and Infectious Diseases (NIAID) confirmed that the third phase of testing for potential vaccines developed by Oxford University and AstraZeneca would begin in July 2020. One of them, AZD1222, reached phase III trials.

On 23 November 2020, Oxford–AstraZeneca announced the vaccine's successful trial, preventing 70% of people developing symptoms. The researchers thought that the figure might be as high as 90% if they tweaked the dose.

In January 2021, India approved the use of the Oxford–AstraZeneca vaccine, paving the way for a mass immunisation campaign in the world's second most populous country. It was announced that the Oxford–AstraZeneca shot would be made locally by the Serum Institute of India (SII) with a brand name COVISHIELD.

Side-effects 
On 29 January 2021, the European Medicines Agency (EMA) recommended granting a conditional marketing authorisation for AZD1222 in people from 18 years of age. By mid-March 2021, The Netherlands, Denmark, Norway, Iceland, Bulgaria and Ireland had suspended the use of the AstraZeneca vaccine due to worries over six cases of a "rare combination" of blood clots with lowered blood platelets, see embolic and thrombotic events after COVID-19 vaccination. The temporary halt was against the advice of the European Union's medicines regulator who said the benefits of the vaccine still outweigh any potential risks.

EMA issued a statement on 18 March 2021 stating that no association between vaccination with AstraZeneca vaccines and clot-related cases had been found, but this could not be ruled out and further investigations were being carried out. The EMA also stressed that the benefits of AstraZeneca vaccine outweigh the risks of possible side effects.

Name change 
On 30 March 2021, the Swedish Medicines Agency, Läkemedelsverket, announced that following the prior approval of the EMA it would change the name of the vaccine to Vaxzevria, stressing that only the name of the vaccine would change, not the composition.

Side-effects 
On 6 April 2021, EMA head of vaccines Marco Cavaleri announced that it could be declared that there was a link between the Oxford–AstraZeneca COVID-19 (Vaxzevria) vaccine and rare blood clots associated with low platelet counts. In a statement the following day, the EMA confirmed the link, but continued to recommend the vaccine, saying the benefits of the vaccine far outweigh the risks. Later, a Scottish vaccine efficacy study confirmed the validity of this statement, showing an 88 percent reduction in the risk of hospitalization after the first dose of Vaxzevria from the fourth week onwards. The  European Medicines Agency also identified, over time, the development of the rare neurological disease Guillain-Barré syndrome (GBS) as a possible side effect of Vaxzevria. By the time of the EMA's decision in September 2021, Guillain-Barré syndrome was unlikely to have occurred, with only 833 cases of GBS reported in 8 months following the administration of 592 million doses of the vaccine. In December 2021, the scientists from Arizona State University and Cardiff University identified “the trigger” behind blood clots. Professor Alan Parker said: “Our data confirms PF4 can bind to adenoviruses, an important step in unravelling the mechanism underlying VITT. Establishing a mechanism could help to prevent and treat this disorder.”

Lawsuits 
In April 2021, the European Commission announced that it would sue Astra Zeneca for delaying the timely delivery of Vaxzevria at a time when "every vaccine counts, because every vaccine can save lives". In September 2021, the lawsuit was finally settled with AstraZeneca agreeing to deliver 60 million doses of vaccines to EU member states by October, 75 million by the end of the year, and 65 million more by April 2022.

Acquisition history
The following is an illustration of the company's major mergers and acquisitions and historical predecessors:

 AstraZeneca
 AstraZeneca (Merged 1999)
 Astra AB (Founded 1913)
 Tika (Acq 1939)
 Zeneca (Spun off from Imperial Chemical Industries, 1993)
 Salick Health Care (Acq 1996)
 Ishihara Sangyo Kaisha (US fungicide operations, Acq 1997)
 KuDOS Pharmaceuticals (Acq 2005)
 MedImmune Biologics
 Cambridge Antibody Technology (Acq 2006)
 Aptein Inc (Acq 1998)
 MedImmune (Acq 2007)
 Definiens (Acq 2014)
 Arrow Therapeutics (Acq 2007)
 Novexel Corp (Acq 2010)
 Guangdong BeiKang Pharmaceutical Company (Acq 2011)
 Ardea Biosciences (Acq 2012)
 Amylin Pharmaceuticals (Acq 2012 jointly with Bristol-Myers Squibb)
 Spirogen (Acq 2013)
 Pearl Therapeutics (Acq 2013)
 Omthera Pharmaceuticals (Acq 2013)
 ZS Pharma (Acq 2015)
 Alexion Pharmaceuticals (Acq 2021)
 Proliferon Inc (Acq 2000, restructured into Alexion Antibody Technologies Inc)
 Enobia Pharma Corp (Acq 2011)
 Synageva BioPharma (Acq 2015)
 Wilson Therapeutics (Acq 2018)
 Syntimmune (Acq 2018)
 Achillion Pharmaceuticals (Acq 2019)
 Portola Pharmaceuticals (Acq 2020)
 Caelum Biosciences (Acq 2021)
 TeneoTwo (Acq 2022)
 LogicBio Therapeutics (Acq 2022)
 Neogene Therapeutics (Acq 2022)
 CinCor Pharma (Acq 2023)

Operations

AstraZeneca develops, manufactures and sells pharmaceutical and biotechnology products to treat disorders in the oncology, cardiovascular, gastrointestinal, infection,  neuroscience, respiratory and inflammation areas.

AstraZeneca has its corporate headquarters in Cambridge, United Kingdom, and its main research and development (R&D) centres are in Cambridge (UK), Gaithersburg (Maryland, US), Gothenburg (Sweden) and Warsaw (Poland).

Orphan drugs

In April 2015, AstraZeneca's drug tremelimumab was approved as an orphan drug for the treatment of mesothelioma in the United States. In February 2016, AstraZeneca announced that a clinical trial of tremelimumab as a treatment for mesothelioma failed to meet its primary endpoint.

Senior management
As of 2008, David Brennan was paid US$1,574,144 for his role as chief executive officer.

On 26 April 2012, it was announced that Brennan was to retire in early June of that year. In August 2012, Pascal Soriot was named CEO of AstraZeneca.

It was also announced that Leif Johansson would succeed Louis Schweitzer as non-executive chairman on 1 June 2012, three months earlier than previously announced, and would become Chairman of the Nomination and Governance Committee after the 2012 Annual General Meeting.

The company's non-executive Board directors are Philip Broadley, Euan Ashley, Michel Demaré, Deborah DiSanzo, Diana Layfield, Sheri McCoy, Tony Mok, Nazneen Rahman, Andreas Rummelt, and Marcus Wallenberg.

Outreach

Political lobbying 
AstraZeneca is a member of the Personalized Medicine Coalition, a medical research advocacy group that lobbies on behalf of the pharmaceutical industry.

Controversies

Seroquel
In April 2010, AstraZeneca settled a qui tam lawsuit brought by Stefan P. Kruszewski for US$520 million to settle allegations that the company defrauded Medicare, Medicaid, and other government-funded health care programs in connection with its marketing and promotional practices for the blockbuster atypical antipsychotic, Seroquel. According to the settlement agreement, AstraZeneca targeted its illegal marketing of the anti-psychotic Seroquel towards doctors who do not typically treat schizophrenia or bipolar disorder, such as physicians who treat the elderly, primary care physicians, pediatric and adolescent physicians, and in long-term care facilities and prisons.

In March 2011, AstraZeneca settled a lawsuit in the United States totalling US$68.5 million to be divided up to 38 states.

Nexium
The company's most commercially successful medication is esomeprazole (Nexium). The primary uses are treatment of gastroesophageal reflux disease, treatment and maintenance of erosive esophagitis, treatment of duodenal ulcers caused by Helicobacter pylori, prevention of gastric ulcers in those on chronic NSAID therapy, and treatment of gastrointestinal ulcers associated with Crohn's disease. When it is manufactured the result is a mixture of two mirror-imaged molecules, R and S. Two years before the omeprazole patent expired, AstraZeneca patented S-omeprazole in pure form, pointing out that since some people metabolise R-omeprazole slowly, pure S-omeprazole treatment would give higher dose efficiency and less variation between individuals. In March 2001, the company began to market Nexium, as it would a brand new drug.

The (R)-enantiomer of omeprazole is metabolized exclusively by the enzyme CYP2C19, which is expressed in very low amounts by 3% of the population. Treated with a normal dose of the enantiomeric mixture, these persons will experience blood levels five-times higher than those with normal CYP2C19 production. In contrast, esomeprazole is metabolized by both CYP2C19 and CYP3A4, providing less-variable drug exposure. While omeprazole is approved only at doses of up to 20 mg for the treatment of gastroesophageal reflux, esomeprazole is approved for doses up to 40 mg.

In 2007, Marcia Angell, former editor-in-chief of the New England Journal of Medicine and a lecturer in social medicine at the Harvard Medical School, said in Stern, a German-language weekly newsmagazine, that AstraZeneca's scientists had misrepresented their research on the drug's efficiency, saying: "Instead of using presumably comparable doses [of each drug], the company's scientists used Nexium in higher dosages. They compared 20 and 40 mg Nexium with 20 mg Prilosec. With the cards having been marked in that way, Nexium looked like an improvement – which however was only small and shown in only two of the three studies."

Bildman fraud, sexual harassment and faithless servant clawback
On 4 February 1998, Astra USA sued Lars Bildman, its former president and chief executive officer, seeking US$15 million for defrauding the company. The sum included US$2.3 million in company funds he allegedly used to fix up three of his homes, plus money the company paid as the result of the EEOC investigation. Astra's lawsuit alleged Bildman sexually harassed and intimidated employees, used company funds for yachts and prostitutes, destroyed documents and records, and concocted: "tales of conspiracy involving ex-KGB agents and competitors. This was in a last-ditch effort to distract attention from the real wrongdoer, Bildman himself." Bildman had already pleaded guilty in US District Court for failing to report more than US$1 million in income on his tax returns. In addition, several female co-workers filed personal sexual-harassment lawsuits against Bildman. In April 1998, Bildman was sentenced to 21 months in prison three months after he pled  guilty to filing false Federal tax returns.

In February 1998, AstraZenaca's U.S. affiliate Astra U.S.A. agreed to a $10 million settlement after an Equal Employment Opportunity Commission investigation which started in May 1996 found that sexual harassment against female employees. 120 former female employees of Astra were interviewed during the inquiry, with about 80 of them being identified as able to file claims. Astra U.S.A. also issued a statement of apology for the hostile work environment.

In Astra USA v. Bildman, 914 N.E.2d 36 (Mass. 2009), applying New York's faithless servant doctrine, the court held that a company's employee who had engaged in financial misdeeds and sexual harassment must "forfeit all of his salary and bonuses for the period of disloyalty". The court held that this was the case even if the employee "otherwise performed valuable services", and that the employee was not entitled to recover restitution for the value of those other services. The decision attracted a good deal of attention by legal commentators.

CAFÉ study
In 2004, University of Minnesota research participant Dan Markingson committed suicide while enrolled in an industry-sponsored pharmaceutical trial comparing three FDA-approved atypical antipsychotics: Seroquel (quetiapine), Zyprexa (olanzapine), and Risperdal (risperidone). University of Minnesota Professor of Bioethics Carl Elliott noted that Markingson was enrolled in the study against the wishes of his mother, Mary Weiss, and that he was forced to choose between enrolling in the study or being involuntarily committed to a state mental institution. A 2005 FDA investigation cleared the university. Nonetheless, controversy around the case has continued. A Mother Jones article resulted in a group of university faculty members sending a public letter to the university Board of Regents urging an external investigation into Markingson's death.

Transfer mispricing
In 2010, AstraZeneca agreed to pay £505 million to settle a UK tax dispute related to transfer mispricing.

Conflicting commitments to the UK and the EU 

In August 2020 AstraZeneca declared towards the European Commission and the EU member states:
"13.1. AstraZeneca represents, warrants and covenants to the Commission and the Participating Member States that: [...] (e) it is not under any obligation, contractual or otherwise, to any Person or third party in respect of the Initial Europe Doses or that conflicts with or is inconsistent in any material respect with the terms of this Agreement or would impede the complete fulfilment of its obligation under this Agreement;"

However, the UK Secretary of State for Health and Social Care, Matt Hancock, declared in March 2021 that the United Kingdom had been given "exclusivity" and that the EU's treaty was "inferior". After placing the order for AstraZeneca's vaccine, the European Commission mistakenly assumed that it had enough vaccines and initially ordered only 200 million doses from Pfizer–BioNTech when the manufacturers offered 500 million doses to the EU in November 2020.

However, the contract that AstraZeneca reached with the UK was very similar to that it reached with the EU, and it also contained the phrase "best reasonable efforts"; the UK contract was signed on 28 August 2020, a day after the contract with the EU. The key difference seems to be that AstraZeneca entered into a preliminary agreement with the U.K. back in May 2020 which arranged for "the development of a dedicated supply chain for the U.K." The failure to produce the vaccine in the anticipated quantities contributed to the low vaccination rates of vulnerable populations of the European Union at the beginning of the outbreak of more virulent variants of SARS-CoV-2 in early 2021.

See also

 Pharmaceutical industry in the United Kingdom
 List of pharmaceutical companies

Notes

References

External links
 
 

Swedish companies established in 1999
British companies established in 1999
 
British brands
Swedish brands
Companies based in Cambridge
Biotechnology companies established in 1999
Pharmaceutical companies established in 1999
Multinational companies headquartered in Sweden
Multinational companies headquartered in England
Pharmaceutical companies of England
Pharmaceutical companies of Sweden
Biotechnology companies of the United Kingdom
Biotechnology companies of Sweden
Life sciences industry
Orphan drug companies
Vaccine producers
Medical research
Södertälje Municipality
Companies related to the Wallenberg family
Companies listed on the London Stock Exchange
Companies listed on Nasdaq Stockholm
COVID-19 vaccine producers